The 2023 European Tour, titled as the 2023 DP World Tour for sponsorship reasons, is the 52nd season of golf tournaments since the European Tour officially began in 1972.

It is the second season of the tour under a title sponsorship agreement with DP World, that was announced in November 2021.

In September 2022, the opening six events of the 2023 season were announced; they were all co-sanctioned events, four with the South Africa-based Sunshine Tour and two with the PGA Tour of Australasia, and were scheduled for late 2022.

Changes for 2023

Player Earnings Assurance Programme
In November 2022, alongside the schedule release, the tour announced that they would introduce a "Player Earnings Assurance Programme", which would guarantee minimum earnings of US$150,000 for all exempt players from categories 1–17 if they competed in at least 15 tournaments.

Rankings name change
In November 2022, the tour announced that the DP World Tour Rankings would be reverted back to the Race to Dubai, the name which had been in place between 2009 and 2021.

PGA Tour promotions
As part of the PGA Tour strategic alliance expansion which had been signed in June 2022, the 2023 season saw the beginning of PGA Tour status being awarded to the top 10 players (not otherwise exempt) on the Race to Dubai.

Schedule
The following table lists official events during the 2023 season.

Unofficial events
The following events will be sanctioned by the European Tour, but will not carry official money, nor will wins be official.

See also

2023 Challenge Tour
2023 European Senior Tour
2023 Ladies European Tour
2022–23 PGA Tour

Notes

References

External links
Official site

2023
2022 in golf
2023 in golf
European Tour